Formula Atlantic is a specification of open-wheel racing car developed in the 1970s. It was used in professional racing through the IMSA Atlantic Championship until 2009 and is currently primarily used in amateur racing through Sports Car Club of America Formula Atlantic.

History
The history of Formula Atlantic begins with the SCCA Formula B class, created in 1965 for single-seat formula cars with engines not exceeding 1600cc in capacity. Prior to Formula Atlantic, professional Formula B races were held in the United States from 1965 to 1972, firstly with the SCCA's poorly supported Formula A, then as part of the SCCA Grand Prix Championship in 1967 and 1968 and then in their own independent series from 1969 to 1972.

Formula Atlantic as a class evolved in the United Kingdom in 1971 from the US Formula B rules, with 1600cc production-based twin-cam engines (initially Cosworth Mk.XIII based on Lotus-Ford Twin Cam and then Cosworth BDD, however other engines like Alfa Romeo were also eligible). Conceived by John Webb of Brands Hatch (who would later also develop the Sports 2000 class) as a category for national competitors with the performance near a Formula Two car but running costs at or below that of a contemporary Formula Three car. A single Yellow Pages championship ran in 1971-2, with a rival BP backed series appearing in 1973. 1974 saw the BP series changing sponsor to John Player, and the Yellow Pages series becoming backed by John Webb's MCD organisation and Southern Organs; in practice most top drivers competed in both series and there were no date clashes. Only one series ran in 1975-6, in the final year taking the title Indylantic and adopting Indianapolis-style single-car qualifying. But the formula was under threat from Formula Three and no series ran in 1977-78. A BRSCC-organized club racing series returned in 1979 with initial backing from Hitachi and continued to 1983, with diminishing grids and few new cars appearing.

As a result of its similarity to Formula Two and Formula Three in terms of chassis regulations, Formula Atlantic typically used chassis closely related to these cars—with performance somewhere in between the two—so most of the manufacturers were familiar from those classes, particularly the likes of Brabham, Lotus, March, Chevron early on, with Ralt and then Reynard later. US manufacturer Swift came to displace the British imports and dominate in North America. Several smaller marques also appeared.

The first professional races run under Formula Atlantic rules in North America were conducted in 1974 by the CASC in Canada (now ASN Canada), drawing much attention and large fields due to its national CTV television coverage. IMSA in the United States took advantage of the large number of teams and organized their own series in 1976.

During these years, the series attracted guest drivers from Europe, including Formula One, particularly at the Trois-Rivières street race in Quebec, Canada. Guest drivers included James Hunt, Jean-Pierre Jarier, Riccardo Patrese, Patrick Depailler, Jacques Laffite, Didier Pironi and Vittorio Brambilla.

In 1977, the SCCA sanctioned the US events and in 1978 the CASC and SCCA series merged, and conducted the series jointly until 1983, when it ran as the Formula Mondial North American Cup and was won by Michael Andretti. The series could not sustain the success of earlier seasons and was cancelled for 1984. Formula Mondial was an international category introduced by the FIA in 1983 with the intention of replacing both Formula Atlantic and Formula Pacific, the latter being a variant of Formula Atlantic that had been introduced in a number of  Pacific Basin countries  in the late 1970s.

Current FA SCCA Club Racing

SCCA Formula Atlantic cars are allowed wings and ground effects. They use either the Toyota 4AGE engine or the Cosworth BDD. Cars meeting Super Vee specifications were also allowed but are now rarely seen. Prior to 2006 these rules were also largely used in the professional series except that all cars had to run a Fuel Injected 4AGE. This meant that competitive amateur teams could also participate in professional races and that old pro series equipment could be raced at the amateur level. However, in 2006 the pro series introduced a spec chassis, the Swift Engineering 016.a and a new spec engine, the Mazda-Cosworth MZR. The result was that the cars used in the pro series were drastically different from the amateur cars. In 2009, to shore up small race fields, the pro series introduced a "C2 class" for amateur level cars, primarily the Swift 014.a, the dominant chassis in amateur competition at the time. However the C2 class saw few entries and was abandoned in the middle of the season.

Since 2011 SCCA Club Racing has allowed the Swift 016.a and Mazda-Cosworth MZR, albeit with an inlet restrictor to maintain parity with the older Toyota-powered cars. As of 2017 most nationals competitors were running the 016.a-Mazda combination. Also eligible for the class are Mazda rotary powered cars made for the Pro Mazda Championship. In 2018 the professional series will switch to a new car and all of the rotary cars will be available for club racing use, although they appear to not be competitive with cars built to the FA specification, even older ones. Additionally, in 2019 the SCCA will allowed sealed Mazda MZR engines to be used in older chassis, such as the Swift 014.a, as parts availability for the Toyota engines has become an issue.

The minimum weight of a Toyota or BDD powered Atlantic car is 1230 lbs. (558 kg) with driver. The SCCA considers it its fastest club racing class. Prior to gaining its own class, the Formula SCCA car raced in Formula Atlantic, where it was uncompetitive.

Revived Atlantic Championship

With the end of the IMSA and Champ Car sanctioned professional Atlantic Championship after the 2009 season, the promoters of the F2000 Championship Series, Formula Race Productions, promoted a new pro series in 2012 using SCCA rules and sanctioned by the SCCA. The series saw few entrants and folded after one season. However, due to increasing interest at the amateur level, on October 1, 2013, it was announced that the series would return in 2014 with a twelve race, six weekend race calendar. Sanctioning will transition to the United States Auto Club in 2017.

Tribute
In 2012 and 2014, the Rolex Monterey Motorsports Reunion historic automobile racing event at Mazda Raceway Laguna Seca in Monterey, California had a tribute to Formula Atlantic as a part of its scheduled groups.

Formula Atlantic at the SCCA National Championship Runoffs

See also
 Formula Pacific
 Formula Mondial

References

External links

SCCA Club Racing - Formula Classes rule book

 
Sports Car Club of America